Although slavery is recognized as being illegal around the world by international treaties and conventions, evidence has shown that there is still existing slavery in Yemen, and the number of slaves is in fact growing. Slavery affects and inhibits many basic human rights, and was specifically abolished by Yemen in 1962. That slavery is alleged to still exist is a major human rights issue.

Yemen is in Southwest Asia, and is a mostly Arab country. Yemen is considered a developing country, and has been in a state of political crisis since 2011.  An investigation conducted as a joint effort by local press in Yemen, human rights activists and the wider media uncovered an array of evidence strongly suggesting slavery is still alive in Yemen, with a former slave who had recently been freed admitting other members of his family were still being used as slaves. In this in depth investigation, that was done over a period of several months, slave owners admitted to selling slaves to countries such as Brazil and Saudi Arabia for significant amounts of money, suggesting that the problem of modern slavery goes far deeper than just Yemen. It was also discovered that not unlike previous times, slaves were inherited by their owners through family, as well as being bought and sold. The slaves are under complete control of their owners, an example of this being that although sometimes the slaves are allowed to marry one another, they are not allowed a ceremony, and are only allowed to see each other during an emergency or at night when their owner does not require them. In a sense, slavery has even been formally recognised in Yemen, through a judge in the Courts confirming the transfer of a slave from one owner to another. This caused an outcry by the community and the media, which was allegedly quickly hushed by the government.

History of slavery

Part of Yemen was controlled by the British Empire in the 19th- and 20th-century in the form of the Chief Commissioner's Province of Aden (1839-1932) and the Colony of Aden (1937-1963).  The British Empire, having signed the 1926 Slavery Convention, was obliged to fight slavery and slave trade in all land under direct or indirect control of the British Empire.  However, the British control of Yemen was not complete even in the part of Yemen which was nominally controlled by them.  The Colony of Aden was divided into an eastern colony and a western colony. Those were further divided into 23 sultanates and emirates, and several independent tribes that had no relationships with the sultanates. The deal between the sultanates and Britain detailed protection and complete control of foreign relations by the British.  This limited their actual power to do something about slavery. 

In 1936, the British authorities in Aden filed a raport about the slavery in Yemen.  The British raport had information of between 5.000 to 10.000 slaves in a population of three million.  The majority of the slaves were either trafficked from Africa, or born to enslaved Africans in Yemen, and a small minority of the slaves where Caucasian.  Most of the male slaves were Africans, occupied in agricultural work or as soldiers.   The British also had information of women from China and Java kept as concubines (which were synonymous with sex slaves) by rich men.  Among the slaves were Chinese women bought from Singapore, and Indian women sold by their husband.   Many Africans had been trafficked to Yemen as servants and then sold by their employers, and children from South East Asia had been brought to Arabia under the pretext of studying, but been sold after arrival.

The British, obliged by the 1926 Slavery Convention to abolish all practice of slavery in the British Empire, did not abolish the slavery as an institution in Yemen, but managed to free many slaves by buying them, manumitting them, and relocating them within the British Empire.

Abolishment of slavery
The worldwide abolition of slavery began in the seventeenth and eighteenth centuries, when the Declaration of the Rights of Man was adopted in 1789, and stated “men are born and remain free and equal in rights.”  By the nineteenth century, an increasing number of countries such as The Netherlands were banning participation with the African Slave Trade, and soon after abolished slavery in all of its colonies, along with France. By the 1900s, abolition of slavery was spreading globally, with countries such as Burma and Sierra Leone following the movement. 

After World War II, there was a growing international pressure from the United Nations to end the slave trade in the Arabian Peninsula.  In 1948, the United Nations declared slavery to be a crime against humanity in the Universal Declaration of Human Rights, after which the Anti-Slavery Society pointed out that there were about one million slaves in the Arabian Peninsula, which was a crime against the 1926 Slavery Convention, and demanded that the UN form a committee to handle the issue. 

In 1962, Yemen was one of the last countries worldwide to abolish slavery. Besides this, Yemen is also a member state of the United Nations. All United Nations member states are subject to the Universal Declaration of Human Rights (UDHR), which specifically says in Article 4, that “No one shall be held in slavery or servitude; slavery and the slave trade shall be prohibited in all their forms.” This declaration outlines basic rights that all human beings are entitled to. The rights outlined in the declaration become legally enforceable, since they define the terms ‘fundamental freedoms’ and ‘human rights’, which themselves feature in the  United Nations Charter. All member states of the United Nations are legally obliged to comply with the United Nations Charter. 

Besides this, the Slavery Convention 1926 also exists, which at its creation aimed to prevent slavery, and the slave trade. It specifically defined what slavery and the slave trade were, and all participants agreed to prevent, and gradually eliminate all slavery that existed within their country, and also to create penalties for anyone found to be slave trading, or involved in the control of a slave. As of 1987, Yemen became a party to this convention, meaning they agreed with the aim of it, and agreed to the obligations it imposed upon parties.

Modern day slavery in Yemen
For someone to be considered a slave, they must fit into one of the following four categories:
1)	Be threatened, either physically or mentally, to work.
2)	Controlled or owned by another person, through either threats, or abuse that is physical or mental.
3)	Treated as a chattel, bought or sold as property, dehumanised.
4)	Restrained physically, or has limitations on freedom of movement. 

It has been reported that two main types of slavery currently exist in Yemen. The first is general human trafficking, which can be defined as adults or children lured into a situation that results in their exploitation, by way of threats, violence or deliberate misrepresentation, and then forced to perform certain jobs.  The second type is those who are not subject to trafficking, but instead still endure slavery and abuse. Such abuse has been reported to be depriving slaves of a basic right of access to water, unless their owner permits it. 

Children are extremely vulnerable to slavery in Yemen, as any children of existing slaves are also destined for a life of slavery, and also children are often forced to work for minimal, or even no pay, in the agricultural sector. The legal age for children to begin work in Yemen is 14, and the minimum age they can begin work that is considered to be hazardous is 18. However, in 2012, it was found that 13.6% of children aged 5 to 14 were working across several sectors, though the most predominant sector involving children was found to be the agricultural sector, which incidentally is also one of the most hazardous sectors. 

As well as child slavery, it has been discovered that there are also adult slaves who are controlled by their owners, who work in private homes, made to perform certain tasks.

Causes of modern day slavery

A likely cause of the existing slavery in Yemen with regards to the illegality of it, is the extent of the poverty within certain communities. Abdulhadi Al-Azazi, a member of the team investigating slavery in Yemen, suggested that because of the levels of poverty, affected people may enable themselves to be controlled by wealthy people in order to have a better quality of life than what they can provide for themselves. 

Another possible factor in the existence of slavery in Yemen is government corruption, as slavery is easy to get away with, and no real steps are taken to put a stop to it, which is what was seen in the investigation mentioned earlier in this article. Besides this, the slavery cycle is difficult to get out of when there is no government intervention, or real awareness by the public and other countries as to what is going on, which is part of the cause of slavery in Yemen. If people aren’t aware of what is happening, they cannot do anything about it. The slavery cycle has been described as poverty, followed by slavery, then as a result lack of education, and therefore no kind of freedom at all. This means any children of existing slaves are led to believe the same as their parents – that they are not entitled to freedom and they must do as they are told by their owners. In 2019, during the Yemeni Civil War, there were allegations of the Houthis supporting the restoration of slavery.

See also
 Al-Akhdam
Human rights in Yemen
 Human trafficking in the Middle East

References

Yemen
Human rights abuses in Yemen